John Steel (1786 – 10 April 1868) was a British Liberal Party politician and solicitor.

Steel practiced as a solicitor from 1809 to 1852, before retiring and entering politics. He was elected MP for Cockermouth at a by-election in 1854, and held the seat until his death in 1868.

References

External links
 

Liberal Party (UK) MPs for English constituencies
UK MPs 1852–1857
UK MPs 1857–1859
UK MPs 1859–1865
UK MPs 1865–1868
1786 births
1868 deaths